Frank Berry  is an Irish film director and screenwriter, known for his social realist dramas focused on marginalised characters. He directed the films Ballymun Lullaby (2011), I Used to Live Here (2014), Michael Inside (2017), and Aisha (2022).

Filmography

Feature films

Documentaries

Short films

Television

Awards and nominations

References

External links
 

Irish film directors
Year of birth missing (living people)
Living people